The following is a list of centenarians – specifically, people who became famous as authors, editors, poets and journalists – known for reasons other than their longevity. For more lists, see lists of centenarians.

References

Authors, poets and journalists